The giant hawkfish (Cirrhitus rivulatus), also known as the hieroglyphic hawkfish, is a species of marine ray-finned fish, a hawkfish belonging to the family Cirrhitidae. It is found in the eastern Pacific Ocean.

Taxonomy
The giant hawkfish was first formally described in 1846 by the French zoologist Achille Valenciennes with the type locality given as the Galápagos Islands. The specific name rivulatus meaning “marked by irregular streaks”, a reference to the black edged, golden-brown markings on the body with thin cobalt-blue surrounds.

Description
The giant hawkfish has a deep body which is not highly laterally compressed. They have large heads with a blunt snout and have a fringe of cirri on the posterior margin of the anterior nostril. They have a moderately large mouth with two types of teeth, an outer row of canines and an inner row of villiform teeth. There are also teeth on the centre and sides of the roof of the mouth. The upper margin of the preoperculum either has small serrations or is smooth and the gill cover has 2 flattened spines. They have a continuous dorsal fin which has 10 spines, the membranes between the spines having deep notches and the tip of each spine has a large tuft of cirri, and 11-12 soft rays with a small incision separating the spiny portion from the soft rayed portion. The anal fin contains 3 spines and 5-7 soft rays. The caudal fin is trubcate. The lower 7 pectoral fin rays are robust, with deeply incised membranes and these are notabtly longer than other pectoral fin rays. The upper 1 and lower 7 pectoral fin rays are unbranched. The pelvic fin has a single spine and 5 soft rays and has its origin behind the base of the pectoral fin. The scales are smooth, the intraorbital space lacks scales and there are fewer than 12 irregular scale rows, made up of small scales, on the cheeks. There are 41-49 scales on the lateral line. It is the largest species in the hawkfish family. The overall colour is greyish brown with 5 vertical bars on the body, each made up of a complex of golden brown markings, each with a black margin which in turn has narrow bright blue edges. The head has thick, golden-brown bands which also have black margins bordered by slender blue edges, eadiating out from the eyes. Most individuals have a pair of white spots on the posterior part of the back. The juveniles have an overall white body marked with dark brown bars.

Distribution and habitat
The giant hawkfish is endemic to the eastern Pacific Ocean. It occurs from southern Baja California and the northern Sea of Cortez to Ecuador, including all of the offshore islands in that region. The juveniles occur in the surge zone and in tidal pools.

Biology
The giant hawkfish is a solitary, benthic species which lies still on rock ledges where its body pattern camouflages it against the rocks. It is a predator which feeds on small fishes and crustaceans, and even small marine iguanas (Amblyrhynchus cristatus). When sitting on the rocks it perches on its pectoral fins. They undertake seasonal movements, in southern Baja California they move into shallower water when the water temperature rises, typically in May.

References

External links
 Summary of Giant Hawkfish
 In Sportfishing
 Native range and map distribution.
 Giant Hawkfish and other creature photos native to the Sea of Cortez
 Sea of Cortez wildlife
 

Giant hawkfish
Fish of the Gulf of California
Western Central American coastal fauna
Galápagos Islands coastal fauna
Tiburón Island
Fish described in 1846
Taxa named by Achille Valenciennes